Page Four was a Danish boy band established in Copenhagen in November 2014 by the four members: Lauritz Emil Christiansen, Jonas Eilskov, Stefan Hjort and Pelle Højer. The band got discovered by uploading cover versions online and were eventually signed to Sony Music Entertainment Denmark.

The group sang in Danish and their debut single "Sommer" was co-written by Tim McEwan, Theis Andersen and Søren Ohrt Nissen. The single, as well as the following three singles "Fucking smuk" "Du og jeg - Magi i luften", and "Vinder" all reached top 15 in the Danish single chart Tracklisten. "Sommer" also entered the Europe Official Top 100.

Discography

Albums

Singles

Videography
2015: "Sommer"
2016: "Vinder"
2016: "17 år"

References

External links
Official website

Danish pop music groups
Danish boy bands